Nijeveen is a village in the Dutch province of Drenthe. It is a part of the municipality of Meppel, and lies about 5 km northwest of Meppel.

History 
The village was first mentioned in 1310 as "in Hesselrevene", and means "new bog". Nijeveen is a road village which started as a peat excavation settlement. 

In 1477, a piece of land was purchased by the farmers in the centre of the hamlet to built a church and clergy house. The church was enlarged in 1627 and the 18th century. The tower dates shortly after 1477, but has a date of 1683 when it is probably restored or rebuilt.

Nijeveen was home to 390 people in 1840.

Since 1976 there is a German windmill named De Sterrenberg which has a cap winded by a fantail. Nijeveen was a separate municipality until 1998, when it was amalgamated with Meppel.

Gallery

References

Municipalities of the Netherlands disestablished in 1998
Populated places in Drenthe
Former municipalities of Drenthe
Meppel